Bugula neritina (commonly known as brown bryozoan or common bugula) is a cryptic species complex of sessile marine animal in the genus Bugula.

It is invasive with a cosmopolitan distribution.

Bugula neritina is of interest from a drug discovery perspective because its bacterial symbiont, Candidatus Endobugula sertula, produces the bryostatins, a group of around twenty bioactive natural products. The bryostatins are under investigation for their therapeutic potential directed at cancer immunotherapy, treatment of Alzheimer's disease, and HIV/AIDS eradication, due to their low toxicity and antineoplastic activity. 

The draft whole genome of Bugula neritina has recently been sequenced. This adds to the growing number of genomes on the total list of sequenced animal genomes.

Bugula neritina is also of interest in materials science, where it is used as a model organism in biofouling studies.

References 

 Linnaeus, C. (1758). Systema Naturae per regna tria naturae, secundum classes, ordines, genera, species, cum characteribus, differentiis, synonymis, locis. Editio decima, reformata. Laurentius Salvius: Holmiae. ii, 824 pp

Cheilostomatida
Animals described in 1758
Taxa named by Carl Linnaeus